Cuggiono is a small Italian town and comune in the Metropolitan City of Milan,  west of Milan on the Motorway A4 to Turin, gate of Marcallo-Mesero.

American baseball player Yogi Berra's parents were from there. Italian singer and composer Angelo Branduardi was born there.

Cuggiono is the sister city of Herrin, Illinois.  Many Italians from Cuggiono, emigrated to Southern Illinois to work in the coal mines with hopes of the American Dream in the late 19th and early 20th centuries.  They formed neighborhoods in towns throughout Southern Illinois.

Cuggiono borders the following municipalities: Castano Primo, Buscate, Arconate, Robecchetto con Induno, Galliate, Mesero and Bernate Ticino.

References

External links
 Official website

Cities and towns in Lombardy